Fulad Kola may refer to:
 Fulad Kola, Babol
 Fulad Kola, Babolsar
 Fulad Kola, Nur
 Fulad Kola, Qaem Shahr